The No Shame Tour was the fourth headlining tour by British recording artist Lily Allen, in support of her fourth studio album, No Shame (2018). The tour started on 5 October 2018 in Santa Ana, and concluded on 17 August 2019 in Dublin.

In comparison with Allen's tour for Sheezus (2014), the tour is a smaller production, with Allen and two other people onstage. The setlist mainly comprises songs from No Shame but also includes older music by Allen, such as "Fuck You", "Smile" and "LDN".

The opening act for North America and Europe was Wolverhampton born artist, S-X.

Set list 
This set list is from the show on 13 October 2018 in Houston. It is not intended to represent all concerts for the tour.

"Come on Then"
"Waste"
"LDN"
"My One"
"What You Waiting For?" 
"Knock 'Em Out"
"Lost My Mind" 
"Smile"
"Party Line" (unreleased song)
"I'm Always on a Mountain When I Fall" (Merle Haggard cover)
"deep end" (Lykke Li cover)
"Pushing Up Daises"
"Three"
"Everything to Feel Something"
"The Fear"
"Higher"
"Family Man" 
"Who'd Have Known"
"Not Fair"
Encore
"Apples"
"Trigger Bang"
"Fuck You"

Tour dates

Cancelled shows

Notes

References

Lily Allen
Lily Allen concert tours
2018 concert tours
2019 concert tours
Concert tours of Australia
Concert tours of Canada
Concert tours of Europe
Concert tours of France
Concert tours of Germany
Concert tours of Ireland
Concert tours of North America
Concert tours of New Zealand
Concert tours of South America
Concert tours of the United Kingdom
Concert tours of the United States